Karen Aliprendi de Carvalho is a Monegasque politician, member of the National Council since was elected in the 2018 general election. She is from Priorité Monaco political party.

References

Living people
Monegasque women in politics
21st-century women politicians
Members of the National Council (Monaco)
Priorité Monaco politicians
1986 births